Rizvi Karim Rumi (born 18 May 1968) is a retired Bangladeshi footballer who played either as a winger or as a striker. Rumi captained the Bangladesh national football team for a brief period between 1992 and 1993. He spent most of his career with Abahani Limited and also had a brief stint in the Calcutta Football League with East Bengal.

Club career
Rumi started his career with in the Dhaka League with Sadharan Bima SC, in 1984. In his debut season he scored a hat-trick against Azad Sporting Club and finished top-scorer in the DMFA Cup with 6 goals. In 1987, he joined another office club, BRTC. Rumi finished as the joint top scorer alongside Rumman Bin Wali Sabbir, when his BRTC team took part in the 1987 Federation Cup. 

This led to him being scouted by Dhanmondi giants Abahani Limited, and he signed for the club on 16 August 1988. During the next 3 years, Rumi went onto win the Dhaka League in 1989–90, the Federation Cup in 1988 and, also the 1990 Independence Cup where Rumi scored a brace against rivals Mohammedan SC in the final. Rumi also finished the 1990 league season as the leagues second top goalscorer.

In 1991, during the BTC Clubs Cup held in Bangladesh, to aid  cyclone and flood victims, Rumi scored the winner against India's East Bengal Club in the semi-final (2–1). Abahani then went onto defeat rivals Mohammedan in the final to secure the trophy. Rumi's brilliant performances with the Abahani earned him a chance to move abroad, he signed for East Bengal Club in the Calcutta Football League. He was one of three players from Bangladesh that signed for the "Red and Gold Brigade", with Monem Munna and Sheikh Mohammad Aslam joining him in Kolkata in 1991. He won the league title during his lone year at the club, and returned to Abahani the same year. In 1993 he was named the clubs captain.

In 1994, Rumi joined fellow title challengers Muktijoddha Sangsad KC, after the gentleman's agreement between the country's three biggest clubs, Abahani, Mohammedan SC and Brothers Union, to lower the salaries of their star players. Nevertheless, Rumi returned to Abahani after two years and won the Federation Cup in 1997. The subsequent season, after suffering from continuous injuries for the past few years, Rumi retired, as one of the finest forwards Bangladesh ever produced.

Transfer drama
In 1989, Abahani's greatest rivals, Mohammedan wanted to sign Rumi. However, their Iranian coach Nasser Hejazi who was also the coach of the Bangladesh national football team at the time, went against the club’s officials, as he did not want to sign the player without Abahani's permission. Rumi, later stated that he did not want to leave as well, as he wanted to play alongside teammate Monem Munna, who was seen as the biggest talent in the country at the time.

International career
Rumi made his debut for Bangladesh during the 1988 AFC Asian Cup qualifiers. He was a member of the Bangladesh Red team which defeated South Korea University in the 1989 President's Gold Cup. He is well known for scoring a brace against India in the 1991 South Asian Games. Rumi was named the national team captain during the 1992 AFC Asian Cup qualifiers, held in Thailand. His most memorable goal for the country came against Japan during the 1994 FIFA World Cup qualifiers, a game Bangladesh ended up losing 4–1.

He also represented the team during a disappointing 1993 South Asian Games, where hosts Bangladesh were knocked out in the group stages. Rumi's last international tournament was the Qatar Independence Cup 1994, where the Bangladesh national team was represented by Muktijoddha Sangsad KC.

International goals
Scores and results list Bangladesh's goal tally first.

International goals for club

Abahani Limited Dhaka
Scores and results list Abahani Limited Dhaka goal tally first.

Personal life
After retiring from playing professional football in 1998, Rumi moved to Canada with his wife and son.

Honours

Club

Abahani Limited Dhaka
 Dhaka League:  1989–90, 1992
 Federation Cup: 1985, 1986, 1988
 Independence Cup: 1990
 Sait Nagjee Trophy: 1989
 BTC Club Cup: 1991
 DMFA Cup: 1994
 Charms Cup: 1994

 East Bengal Club 
 Calcutta Football League: 1991
 Durand Cup: 1991
 IFA Shield: 1991

 Muktijoddha SKC 
 Federation Cup: 1994

International

 Bangladesh 
 South Asian Games Silver medal: 1989; Bronze medal: 1991

Awards and accolades
1992 − Sports Writers Association's Best Footballer Award.

References

External links
 

Living people
1968 births
Bangladeshi footballers
Bangladesh international footballers
Abahani Limited (Dhaka) players
Muktijoddha Sangsad KC players
Association football forwards
Association football wingers
People from Khulna
Bangladeshi expatriate sportspeople in India
Expatriate footballers in India
Calcutta Football League players
East Bengal Club players
Asian Games competitors for Bangladesh
Footballers at the 1990 Asian Games
South Asian Games medalists in football
South Asian Games silver medalists for Bangladesh
South Asian Games bronze medalists for Bangladesh